Pietro Cancellieri (also Pietro Cavalieri) (died 1580) was a Roman Catholic prelate who served as Bishop of Lipari (1571–1580).

Biography
On 3 October 1571, Pietro Cancellieri was appointed during the papacy of Pope Pius V as Bishop of Lipari. On 7 October 1571, he was consecrated bishop by Scipione Rebiba, Cardinal-Priest of Santa Maria in Trastevere, with Umberto Locati, Bishop of Bagnoregio, Eustachio Locatelli, Bishop of Reggio Emilia, serving as co-consecrators. He served as Bishop of Lipari until his death in 1580.

See also
Catholic Church in Italy

References

External links and additional sources
 (for Chronology of Bishops) 
 (for Chronology of Bishops) 

16th-century Italian Roman Catholic bishops
Bishops appointed by Pope Pius V
1580 deaths